Ely is a given name which may refer to:

 Ely Allen (born 1986), American former soccer player
 Ely do Amparo (1921-1991), Brazilian footballer
 Eleandre Ely Buendia (born 1970), Filipino musician, writer and director, songwriter and lead vocalist of the rock band Eraserheads
 Ely Callaway Jr. (1919-2001), founder of Callaway Golf Company
 Eliezer Ely Capacio (1955–2014), Philippine Basketball Association player, coach and executive
 Ely Culbertson (1891–1955), American contract bridge player, popularizer and writer
 Ely Galleani (born 1953), Italian retired film actress
 Ely Guerra (born 1972), Mexican singer-songwriter
 Ely Jacques Kahn (1884–1972), American commercial architect
 Ely S. Parker (1828-1895), Seneca attorney, engineer, diplomat, Union brevet brigadier general in the American Civil War and first Native American Commissioner of Indian Affairs
 Ely Tacchella (born 1936), Swiss former footballer
 Ely Thadeu (born 1982), Brazilian footballer

See also
 Eli (name)